The New Zealand cricket team toured England in the 1986 season to play a three-match Test series against England. New Zealand won the series 1–0 with two matches drawn.

One Day Internationals (ODIs)

New Zealand won the Texaco Trophy on faster run rate.

1st ODI

2nd ODI

Test series summary

First Test

Second Test

Third Test

England's four wicket-keepers
On day 2 of the first Test at Lord's, England wicket-keeper Bruce French was facing a delivery from Richard Hadlee when he was hit on the head and forced to retire hurt. As a consequence of him having to go to hospital, England required the use of a substitute keeper. At the start of New Zealand's first innings, Bill Athey took on the role but it was decided after only a few overs that a specialist was needed. By chance, former England wicket-keeper Bob Taylor, who had retired from first-class cricket, was in the hospitality tent. With the consent of the New Zealand captain Jeremy Coney, Taylor was persuaded to don a borrowed set of pads (although he had had the foresight to bring his gloves with him) and keep wicket for England for the rest of day 2. The following day, England were permitted to call up Bobby Parks of Hampshire as a substitute for the remainder of New Zealand's first innings. The fourth day of the schedule was a rest day, while on day 4 England batted for the second time. Bruce French was finally able to return for New Zealand's second innings on the final day.

References

External sources
 CricketArchive – tour itineraries

Annual reviews
 Playfair Cricket Annual 1987
 Wisden Cricketers' Almanack 1987

1986 in New Zealand cricket
1986 in English cricket
1986
International cricket competitions from 1985–86 to 1988